Damián Anache (born 11 October 1981) is an Argentine composer living in Buenos Aires signed to Concepto Cero and Inkilino Records.

Biography 
Born in Quilmes, Buenos Aires, he studied composition at Universidad Nacional de Quilmes receiving the title of "Bachelor in Electroacoustic Composition" in 2010. There he continues with postgraduate studies and working on his PhD thesis in Social and Human Sciences. As a teacher works at the same National University of Quilmes, at Universidad Nacional de las Artes and Universidad del Cine.

During his teenage years he was part of various rock bands even started college where became performer for the ensembles Buenos Aires Sonora and ENS − Ensamble Nacional del Sur (conducted by Oscar Edelstein). During his participation in the last one, he designed and built their own version of a Lithophone together with Axel Lastra.

As a producer he worked on several projects such as Brahman Cero and Excursiones Polares, including the participation of both bands on the album  Los Ellos  inspired by El Eternauta, the classic science fiction comic created by Argentine writer Héctor Germán Oesterheld with artwork by Francisco Solano López (the edition of the album was supported by the Ministry of Culture of the Nation).

As a composer some of his works have participated in concerts and events held in Conservatorio Santa Cecilia (Roma, ITA); Espacio Sonoro UAM-X - Universidad Autónoma Metropolitana (DF, MEX); CMMAS - Centro Mexicano para la Música y las Artes Sonoras (Morelia, MEX); Museo de Arte Moderno de Ecuador (Quito, ECU); Universidad Nacional de Córdoba (Córdoba, ARG); Centro Cultural Roberto Fontanarrosa (Rosario, ARG); Centro Cultural de España en Buenos Aires and Centro Cultural Recoleta (BsAs, ARG).

His first album Capturas del Único Camino was published in 2014 by Concepto Cero and Inkilino Records, along with the support of Universidad Nacional de Quilmes' research project Spatial sound synthesis in the electroacoustic music, directed by Dr. Oscar Pablo Di Liscia (co-director: Mariano Cura).

Discography

Solo albums
Capturas del Único Camino ( 2014, Concepto Cero & Inkilino Records; 2016, Must Die Records; 2016, Already Dead Tapes)

Compilation appearances (exclusive/non-albums tracks)
 The piece Bucaro appears on Concepto Cero X Concepto Cero (2013, Concepto Cero))

Collaborations
With Rosa Nolly and Leo Salzano, as "Nolly Salzano Anache Trio". 
 The piece Kanda appears on Never Die Already Dead (Already Dead VI) (2016, Already Dead Tapes – AD216)

Other works

Instrumental and tape works 
 Even where exhalation stops (2011), for piano, marimba and electronics. Premiered at EMUFest 2011 on Saturday, October 15, performed by Mizue Suzuki (Piano), Fabio Cuozzo (Marimba) y Federico Scalas (Electronics) 
 Plaza Ida (2009), tape music. Finalist of the Centro Cultural Recoleta's Sonoclip 2009 Contest and also played at " V Jornadas Argentinas de Música Contemporánea ", UNC (2009).
 p < f (read as "from piano to forte") (2005), tape music. This work has been played exclusively at: "I Concierto de Música Electroacústica de Compositores Latinoamericanos" , Museum of Modern Art, Ecuador, 2009, organized by University of Cuenca; "IV Jornadas Argentinas de Música Contemporánea", National University of Córdoba (UNC), 2008; "Interesarte", National University of Quilmes, 2007; "Espacio para Arte Sonoro/Música Experimental", CCEBA 2006; "Música Experimental y Nuevas Tendencias ", Virasoro Bar 2006, Curator: Nicolás Varchausky.

Installations
Búcaro de Secretos (2013). Generative sound installation created by Damián Anache, Ezequiel Abregú and Martín Matus, for Nota al pie ( Editorial Universidad Nacional de Quilmes' bookstore) opening event, held on April 11, 2013.
Alter Ego (2008). Placed at Centro Cultural de España en Buenos Aires''' public bathrooms for the Espacios de Arte Exhibition'', 2008.

References

External links
 official website
 Concepto Cero
 Inkilino Records
 Profile on the website of the National University of Quilmes' School of Arts

Mainstream references
 
 Damián Anache at Bandcamp
 Damián Anache at PD community
 Damián Anache's writings at Academia.edu
 Damián Anache at iTunes
 debut album "Capturas del Único Camino" at Spotify

Interviews and other
 2015 - video interview about Capturas del Único Camino by Concepto Cero Crew (spanish with subtitles)
 May 2, 2015 - interview by Tomatrax Blog (english)

1981 births
Living people
Argentine classical composers
Experimental musicians
Experimental composers
Electroacoustic music composers
Ambient musicians
Minimalist composers
Male classical composers
20th-century male musicians